FK Rudar is a football club from Probištip, North Macedonia. They currently competing in the Macedonian Third League.

History
The club was founded in 1947. The club competed in the Macedonian First League five seasons from 1992 until 1997. The highest ranking club was ninth in the season 1992/93.

Current squad

External links
Club info at MacedonianFootball 
Football Federation of Macedonia 

Football clubs in North Macedonia
Association football clubs established in 1947
1947 establishments in the Socialist Republic of Macedonia
Probištip Municipality
Mining association football teams